The 2009 Michigan State Spartans football team competed on behalf of the Michigan State University in the 2009 NCAA Division I FBS football season. The Spartans were coached by Mark Dantonio, who was in his third season with the Spartans. Michigan State played their home games in Spartan Stadium in East Lansing, Michigan.

Previous season

Recruiting class

Schedule
This season saw the Spartans schedule a Division I FCS opponent (Montana State) for the first time since the NCAA split Division I football in 1978. This left Notre Dame, UCLA, USC, and Washington as the only Division I FBS teams to never have played a lower-division opponent since the split.

Personnel

Regular season

Montana State

Central Michigan

Notre Dame

Wisconsin

Michigan

    
    
    
    
    
    
    
    
    

Michigan came into the game 4–0 (1–0 Big Ten) and ranked #22, looking to reclaim the Paul Bunyan trophy after losing to MSU the previous year. Michigan State dominated the first 55 minutes of regulation, building a 20–6 lead. Michigan rallied with two TDs in the final minutes to send the game to OT, but MSU quickly intercepted a pass and running back Larry Caper rushed 23 yards through multiple tackles for the game-winning score.

Illinois

Northwestern

Iowa

Final Seconds: With 2 seconds remaining in the game, on 4th and Goal from the Michigan State 7 and a half yard line, Iowa QB Ricky Stanzi snapped the ball and passed the ball to Iowa WR Marvin McNutt into the end zone as the time expired to win the game.

Minnesota

Western Michigan

Purdue

Source: ESPN

Penn State

Alamo Bowl

2010 NFL Draft
Only one Spartan was selected in the 2010 NFL Draft. However, wide receiver Blair White signed with the Indianapolis Colts as an undrafted free agent.

References

Michigan State
Michigan State Spartans football seasons
Michigan State Spartans football